Yukitoshi is a masculine Japanese given name.

Possible writings
Yukitoshi can be written using different combinations of kanji characters. Some examples: 

幸敏, "happiness, agile"
幸俊, "happiness, sagacious"
幸寿, "happiness, long life"
幸利, "happiness, benefit"
行敏, "to go, agile"
行俊, "to go, sagacious"
行寿, "to go, long life"
之敏, "of, agile"
之年, "of, filial piety"
志敏, "determination, agile"
志俊, "determination, sagacious"
恭敏, "respectful, agile"
恭俊, "respectful, sagacious"
雪年, "snow, year"
雪寿, "snow, long life"

The name can also be written in hiragana ゆきとし or katakana ユキトシ.

Notable people with the name

, Japanese voice actor
, Japanese footballer

Fictional characters

Yukitoshi Shimizu (清水 幸利), from anime and manga Arifureta: From Commonplace to World's Strongest
Yukitoshi Isaka (伊坂 幸寿), from anime and manga Dokumushi

Japanese masculine given names